Several space objects and features have been named after Romanian people or things in Romania. These include planetary features on Mercury, Mars and Venus and asteroids.

Moon 
 Haret (crater)
 Montes Carpatus

Mercury 
 Eminescu (crater)

Venus 
 Văcărescu (crater)
 Irinuca (crater)
 Natalia (crater)
 Veta (crater)
 Zina (crater)
 Esterica (crater)
 Darclée (patera)

Mars 
 Batoș crater
 Iazu (crater)
 Oituz crater

Asteroids 
 1381 Danubia
 1436 Salonta
 1537 Transylvania
 2331 Parvulesco
 2419 Moldavia
 3359 Purcari
 4268 Grebenikov
 4633 Marinbica
 6429 Brancusi
 7985 Nedelcu
 7986 Romania
 9253 Oberth
 9403 Sanduleak
 9493 Enescu
 9494 Donici
 9495 Eminescu
 10034 Birlan
 10784 Noailles
 12498 Dragesco
 28854 Budisteanu
 100897 Piatra Neamt
 130072 Ilincaignat
 257005 Arpadpal
 263516 Alexescu
 320790 Anestin
 330634 Boico
 346261 Alexandrescu
 358894 Demetrescu
 450931 Coculescu

Stars 
 Galați V1 and Galați V2

Exoplanets 
 Negoiu

References

External links 
 https://www.astro-urseanu.ro/romanipecer.html
 http://www.ziare.com/magazin/spatiu/romani-pe-cer-cratere-cu-nume-romanesti-galerie-foto-1143669
 https://www.rri.ro/ro_ro/nume_romanesti_pe_bolta_cereasca-2594024
 https://www.9am.ro/top/Social/259955/nume-romanesti-pe-cer-10-corpuri-ceresti-si-formatiuni-care-poarta-numele-unor-romani-celebri.html
 https://adevarul.ro/locale/galati/nume-romanesti-celebre-bolta-cereasca-asteroidul-mihai-eminescu-steaua-galati-craterele-elena-vacarescu-spiru-haret-1_5524a215448e03c0fd5697b9/index.html

Space program of Romania